Fei Yu (born 6 February 1991) is a Chinese footballer who currently plays as a defensive midfielder for Dalian Professional in the Chinese Super League.

Club career 
Fei Yu was promoted to the senior squad of top tier club Shanghai Shenhua during the 2010 season, however it wasn't until the end of the 2011 season that he made his debut in a 0-0 draw against Nanchang Hengyuan on 29 October 2011. After only playing in three games for the club he would not renew his contract out of a desire for competitive opportunities elsewhere.

On 2 March 2013, it was announced that Fei had reached an agreement to join Polish, I liga team Warta Poznań. Fei made his debut for the team on 13 April 2013, coming on as substitute against Olimpia Grudziadz in a 1-0 defeat. He would, however be released by the club less than a week later. Fei would go to Portugal to sign with Campeonato Nacional de Seniores side Sertanense in September 2013 and he made his debut for the club on 1 December 2013 in a 2-1 win against Carapinheirense.

On 30 July 2014, Fei returned to China when he transferred to China League One side Shenzhen Ruby. He would go on to establish himself as a regular within the team. By the end of the 2018 China League One campaign he would play an integral part within the team that came runners-up in the division and gained promotion to the top tier. Despite the promotion, with his contract ending he was free to leave and on 26 February 2019, Fei transferred to League One newcomer Nantong Zhiyun.

On 21 April 2022 he joined top tier club Dalian Professional for the start of the 2022 Chinese Super League season. He made  his debut in a league game on 4 June 2022 against Henan Songshan Longmen in a match that ended in a 2-2 draw. He would go on to establish himself as a vital member of the team and score his first goal for the club in a league game on 1 September 2022 against his former club Shenzhen F.C. in a 5-1 victory.

Career statistics
Statistics accurate as of match played 31 December 2022.

References

External links 

 
 

1991 births
Living people
Chinese footballers
Footballers from Shanghai
Shanghai Shenhua F.C. players
Warta Poznań players
Chinese expatriate footballers
Expatriate footballers in Poland
Sertanense F.C. players
Shenzhen F.C. players
Nantong Zhiyun F.C. players
Chinese Super League players
China League One players

Association football midfielders